Abu Kabireh (also Romanized as Abū Kabīreh; also known as Abū Kabīrī and Abū Kabīrīyeh) is a village in Mosharrahat Rural District, in the Central District of Ahvaz County, Khuzestan Province, Iran. At the 2006 census, its population was 163, in 21 families.

References 

Populated places in Ahvaz County